The 1971 Speedway World Pairs Championship was the second FIM Speedway World Pairs Championship. The final took place on 11 July 1971 in Rybnik, Poland. The championship was won by Poland (maximum 30 points) who beat New Zealand (25 points) and Sweden (22 points).

Semifinal 1
  Krsko
 May 20

Semifinal 2
  Leicester
 June 20

World final
  Rybnik, Rybnik Municipal Stadium
 11 July 1971
 Referee:  Georg Traunsburger

Notes:
Two Poles Antoni Woryna (No. 15) and Jan Mucha (No. 16) were track reserves, but they did not start.

See also
 1971 Individual Speedway World Championship
 1971 Speedway World Team Cup
 motorcycle speedway
 1971 in sports

References

1971
World Pairs